The list of escort carriers by country includes all escort aircraft carriers organized by country of origin and service. Where appropriate, a single ship may be listed under multiple countries. For the list of fleet and light carriers see List of aircraft carriers by country.

Carriers operated

Japan

 Taiyo class
 Taiyo 
 Unyō 
 Chuyo 
 Kaiyo  
 Shinyo  
 Shimane Maru class escort carrier  

Escort carriers and similar aviation vessels operated by the Japanese Imperial Army:
 Yamashio Maru
 Akitsu Maru
 Nigitsu Maru
 Kumano Maru

United Kingdom

 Audacity (D10)   
 Long Island class
 Archer (D78)
 Avenger class
 Avenger (D14) 
 Biter (D97)
 Charger  - transfer to Royal Navy in 1941 reversed immediately
 Dasher
 Bogue class
 RN Attacker class 
 Battler
 Attacker
 Hunter
 Chaser
 Fencer
 Stalker
 Pursuer
 Striker
 Searcher
 Ravager
 Tracker
 RN Ameer or Ruler class 
 Slinger
 Atheling
 Emperor
 Ameer
 Begum
 Trumpeter
 Empress
 Khedive
 Speaker
 Nabob 
 Premier
 Shah
 Patroller
 Rajah
 Ranee
 Trouncer
 Thane 
 Queen
 Ruler
 Arbiter
 Smiter
 Puncher
 Reaper
 Activity (D94)  
 Nairana class  
 Nairana (D05) (to Royal Netherlands Navy as Karel Doorman) 
 Vindex (D15) 
 Pretoria Castle (F61) 
 Campania (D48)

United States

Date ranges are commissioning dates, ship counts includes United States Navy and lend-leased Royal Navy vessels (i.e. production totals), count in parenthesis is the number of ships in US service. The degree to which hulls were completed before conversion varies from not at all to already launched.

 2 (1) Long Island class (Jun 1941 — Nov 1941, Type C3 ship conversion)
 45 (11) Bogue class (Jun 1942 — Jun 1943, Type C3 conversion)
 4 (4) Sangamon class (Aug 1942 — Sep 1942, T3 tanker conversion)
 4 (1) Charger class (Mar 1942 — Jul 1942, Type C3 conversion)
 50 (50) Casablanca class (Jul 1943 — Jul 1944)
 19 (19) Commencement Bay class (Nov 1944 — Feb 1946)

See also
 List of escort aircraft carriers of the Second World War

References

Further reading

Escort Carriers